Rajendra Nilkanth Dharkar was an Indian politician and member of the Bharatiya Janata Party. Dharkar was a member of the Madhya Pradesh Legislative Assembly from the Indore-3 constituency in Indore district.

References 

Politicians from Indore
Bharatiya Janata Party politicians from Madhya Pradesh
Madhya Pradesh MLAs 1977–1980
2007 deaths
21st-century Indian politicians